This is a list of people who have converted from Judaism.

Bahá'í Faith
Christianity
Hinduism
Islam
Buddhism
Atheism/Agnosticism

Undetermined
These individuals have left Judaism for an undetermined ideology.
Polemon II, king of Cilicia converted to marry the Jewish princess Berenice; later relapsed.
Uriel da Costa, philosopher shunned for heresy.

See also
 Apostasy from Judaism
 Conversion to Judaism
 Crypto-Judaism
 Humanistic Judaism
Jews and Buddhism
 Jewish atheism
 Jewish Buddhists
 Jewish secularism
 Jews for Jesus
 Messianic Judaism
 Off the derech (OTD)
 The Jew in the Lotus

References

Jews, former
Former